Elections to the Legislative Assembly of the Indian state of Patiala and East Punjab States Union were held on 18 February 1954. 279 candidates competed for the 48 constituencies in the Assembly. There were twelve two-member constituencies and 36 single-member constituencies. Out of these, 2 single member constituencies were reserved for SC.

Results

!colspan=10|
|- style="background-color:#E9E9E9; text-align:center;"
! class="unsortable" |
! Political party !! Flag !! Seats  Contested !! Won !! Net change  in seats !! % of  Seats
! Votes !! Vote % !! Change in vote %
|- style="background: #90EE90;"
| 
| style="text-align:left;" |Indian National Congress
| 
| 60 || 37 ||  9 || 61.67 || 6,96,979 || 43.27 ||  14.61
|-
|
| style="text-align:left;" |Shiromani Akali Dal (Mann Group)
|
| 33 || 10 || New || 16.67 || 3,34,423 || 20.76 || New
|-
|
| style="text-align:left;" |Shiromani Akali Dal (Raman Group)
|
| 22 || 2 || New || 3.33 || 1,19,301 || 7.41 || New
|-
| 
| style="text-align:left;" |Communist Party of India
| 
| 10 || 4 ||  2 || 6.67 || 97,690 || 6.06 ||  1.29
|-
| 
|
| 139 || 7 ||  1 || 11.67 || 3,42,787 || 21.28 || N/A
|- class="unsortable" style="background-color:#E9E9E9"
! colspan = 3|
! style="text-align:center;" |Total seats !! 60 ( 0) !! style="text-align:center;" |Voters !! 26,48,175 !! style="text-align:center;" |Turnout !! colspan = 2|16,10,909 (60.83%)
|}

Elected members

State Reorganization and Merger
On 1 November 1956, Patiala and East Punjab States Union was merged into Punjab under States Reorganisation Act, 1956.

See also

 Patiala and East Punjab States Union Legislative Assembly
 1954 elections in India
 1952 Patiala and East Punjab States Union Legislative Assembly election
 1952 Punjab Legislative Assembly election
 1957 Punjab Legislative Assembly election

References

State Assembly elections in Punjab, India
1950s in Punjab, India
1954 State Assembly elections in India